Matapan railway station 
() is  located in  Pakistan.
Latitude: 24°54'56.16"
Longitude: 67°12'15.48"

See also
 List of railway stations in Pakistan
 Pakistan Railways

References

External links

Railway stations in Pakistan